Southern Cross is a best-selling 1998 novel by Patricia Cornwell in her Andy Brazil series about a reporter for The Charlotte Observer who is also a volunteer cop. 
It tells the story of Police Chief Judy Hammer, who is sent to Richmond, Virginia, the former capital of the Confederate States of America, to investigate crimes. In a review for The New York Times, Marilyn Stasio suggested the characters are flat.

References

Novels by Patricia Cornwell
1998 American novels
Novels set in Richmond, Virginia
G. P. Putnam's Sons books